This is a list of lakes of Iceland (partially indicating surface, depth and volume).
Iceland has over 20 lakes larger than 10 km² (4 sq mi), and at least 40 others varying between 2.5 and 10 km² (1 to 4 sq mi) in size. This list also includes a few smaller lakes and ponds that are considered notable (for example Tjörnin in Reykjavik). The figures for many of the smaller lakes are unreliable. Also, some larger lakes vary considerably in size between years or seasons or, for the reservoirs, according to the needs of power plants.  Some power plant reservoirs may not be present despite being larger than listed lakes.

Larger lakes (>10 km²)

Smaller lakes (<10 km²)

 Litlisjór, 9.2 km², 17 m
 Kleifarvatn, 9.0 km², >90 m (sensitive to climatic and geological change and was getting smaller - started recovering again in 2004)
 Breiðárlón, 8 km² ?
 Reyðarvatn, 8.3 km²
 Hítarvatn, 7.6 km², 24 m
 Miklavatn, 6.6 km², 23 m
 Árneslón, 6.5 km², 116 m 
 Sigríðarstaðavatn, 6.2 km²
 Laxárvatn, 6.0 km²
 Íshólsvatn, 5.2 km², 39 m
 Úlfljótsvatn, 60 m
 Langavatn, 5.1 km², 36 m
 Ánavatn, 4.9 km², 24 m
 Hagalón, 4.6 km², 116 m 
 Hlíðarvatn, 4.4 km², 21 m
 Arnarvatn hið stóra, 4.3 km²
 Þríhyrningsvatn, 4.3 km², 33 m
 Hvalvatn, 4.1 km², 160–180 m
 Másvatn, 4.0 km², 17 m
 Fjallsárlón, 4.0 km² ?
 Skjálftavatn, 4.0 km², 2.5 m
 Stífluvatn, 3.9 km², 23 m
 Fljótavatn, 3.9 km²
 Úlfsvatn, 3.9 km²
 Kálfborgarárvatn, 3.5 km²
 Langavatn, 3.5 km²
 Hraunhafnarvatn, 3.4 km², 3 m
 Haukadalsvatn, 3.3 km², 41 m
 Grænavatn, 3.3 km², 14 m
 Eskihlíðarvatn, 3.3 km², 5 m
 Ljósavatn, 3.2 km², 35 m
 Sandvatn, 3.0 km², 4 m
 Ölvesvatn, 2.8 km²
 Kýlingavötn (Kýlingar), 2.5-3.0 km² (actually two adjoining lakes that nearly form a single body of water)
 Sandvatn, 2.6 km²
 Flóðið, 2.6 km²
 Kvíslavatn nyrðra, 2.6 km²
 Hraunsfjarðarvatn, 2.5 km², 80 m
 Stóra-Viðarvatn, 2.5 km², 20 m
 Oddastaðavatn, 2.5 km², 18 m
 Frostastaðavatn, 2.3 km², >6 m
 Laugarvatn, 2.1 km²
 Meðalfellsvatn, 2.0 km², 19 m
 Elliðavatn, 1.8 km², 7 m
 Hreðavatn, 1.1 km², 20 m
 Skyggnisvatn
 Hvítavatn
 Tjörnin

See also

References

External links 

 Vísindavefurinn (Icelandic source page)
 Veiði í vötnum (Icelandic source page)

Iceland
Lakes